Heteropsis ubenica is a butterfly in the family Nymphalidae. It is found in the Democratic Republic of the Congo, Uganda, Rwanda, Burundi, Tanzania, Malawi and Zambia. The nominate subspecies is found in montane grassland, forest edges and in open glades within forests.  The habitat of subspecies mahale consists of open montane bamboo-mixed forest, subspecies ugandica occurs in sub-montane deciduous woodland and subspecies uzungwa is found in sub-montane and montane grassland, open woodland and forest margins.

Subspecies
Heteropsis ubenica ubenica (southern Tanzania, Malawi, Zambia)
Heteropsis ubenica mahale (Kielland, 1994) (western Tanzania)
Heteropsis ubenica ugandica (Kielland, 1994) (eastern Democratic Republic of the Congo, western Uganda, Rwanda, Burundi, north-western Tanzania)
Heteropsis ubenica uzungwa (Kielland, 1994) (south-central Tanzania)

References

Elymniini
Butterflies described in 1903
Butterflies of Africa